Melissa Dawn Burns (born 1984), also known as Melissa Andrzejewski, is an extreme sports athlete best known for being an American aerobatics pilot, skydiver, B.A.S.E jumper, climber and technical scuba diver. She has won awards at home and internationally for her aerobatics and competitive flying. Melissa works internationally as an airshow display pilot and skydiver.

Early life and education
Andrzejewski started flying when she was 18. She became one of the youngest female pilots to compete in Unlimited World Aerobatics and the youngest female to ever make the US Unlimited Aerobatic Team at 22 years old. Andrzejewski is a graduate of Embry-Riddle Aeronautical University.

Career
Andrzejewski won the Wingsuit B.A.S.E. race to become women's world champion in Voss, Norway at Extreme Sports Week in 2015 and took part in the 164 way vertical world record that same year. Melissa has participated in the Wingsuit World League in China several times for the women's race.

She was inducted into the Embry-Riddle Chancellor's Hall of Fame in 2015.

In June 2016, Andrzejewski participated in a first-of-its-kind aviation stunt where she flew her stunt airplane underneath a motocross freestyle rider, ‘Fitz’  doing a backflip and a slackline artist, ‘Sketchy’ Andy Lewis, on his slackline at the same time. Melissa is a current member of the US Unlimited Aerobatic Team.

Filmography
 Skydancers
 Bush Air
 Keen 'n Able
 60 Minutes Australia
 Caught on Camera
 CBS Sunday Morning Show.

Personal life
Andrzejewski was divorced in May 2016 from Australian Rex Pemberton. Melissa married Trent Burns in 2017 and changed her name to Melissa Dawn Burns and their daughter Isla Sky Burns was born on November 5, 2017 and their son Koa Dean Burns was born November 5, 2019.

References

American skydivers
Aerobatic pilots
Living people
Embry–Riddle Aeronautical University alumni
1984 births